Cycling is a popular mode of transport and recreational sport in the Philippines.

Bicycles were first introduced to the archipelago in the 1880s during the Spanish colonial occupation of the Philippines and served as a common mode of transport, especially among the local mestizo population. In the present day, many of those who cycle in the country mainly do so as a mode of transport and as recreational activities, such as road racing, mountain biking, and recreational cycling. The popularity of cycling, however, was largely limited to local neighborhoods and rural towns as most urban areas were considered to be dangerous for cycling due to the dominance of motorized traffic with little to no cycling infrastructure for protection.

However, as the COVID-19 pandemic led to the suspension and restriction of public transportation in the country, many Filipinos turned to cycling as an alternative mode of transportation, accelerating the development and promotion of active transportation infrastructure in urban areas.

History

Colonial era 
Bicycles were first introduced to the country in the 1880s, among other 20th century technologies introduced during the Spanish colonial occupation of the Philippines. American author Joseph Earle Stevens, who was living in Manila at the time, described cycling as a booming mode of transport on the streets of Manila, especially among the local mestizo  population, as well as bicycle races that took place in Luneta, Manila in his journal entries in 1894. While in exile in Dapitan, Philippine national hero Jose Rizal wrote a letter on December 18, 1895, to his mother, requesting her to buy him a second-hand bicycle that he could use for his trips to town.

Following the Spanish Empire's secession of the Philippines to the United States, bicycles made in the United States found their way into the local streets. In 1901, the Taft Commission under United States Army Provost Marshal General Arthur MacArthur Jr. approved City Ordinance No. 11, or "An Ordinance Relating to the Use of the Public Streets and Places of Manila" for the City of Manila. Under Section 21 of this ordinance, bicycles were regarded as vehicles on public streets and were to adhere to traffic ordinances and regulations. Bicycles were required to carry a bell, which was to be sounded when approaching a street intersection or crossing, or any vehicle or pedestrian occupying the street. Bicycles were also required to carry a light when in use during the night.

Bicycle registration also took place, with over 2,000 bicycles being registered until registration was halted in 1906. The use of bicycles as a recreational activity were marketed in the country as early as the 1920s, with a July 1926 issue of the Philippine Education Magazine promoting bicycle-riding as an economic mode of transport with health benefits.

Commonwealth and WWII era 
During the Commonwealth period, door-to-door salespeople relied on bicycles as personal transportation. Bicycle theft was also rampant during this period as bicycle owners would use heavier and more expensive chains and padlocks to prevent their bicycles from being stolen. This however, was often to no avail as bicycle thieves were typically able to cut the chains or pick the locks, a problem that still persists to the present day.

It was estimated that by 1942, there were over 12,750 bicycles being used as a mode of transport by Manila's then population of 9,000 people, including those in the outlying areas. During the second World War and the Japanese occupation of the Philippines, the Imperial Japanese Army used bicycle brigades during invasions and patrols, with each officer armed with a sheathed katana and a pistol.

By 1944, the occupying Japanese forces seized many carts, bicycles, tricycles, pedicabs, and pushcarts from the local population, crippling local public transportation.

Post-WWII 
Since then, the bicycle continued to serve as a mode of transport for Filipinos, but dwarfed by the popularity of the automobile, motorized tricycles, and the jeepney as a primary mode of transport. As a result, the use of bicycles became more limited to areas with little motorized road traffic, as cycling remained popular as a sport and for cyclotourism.

As the road system and inefficient public transportation struggled to cope with population booms and increasing car ownership, people across different socioeconomic backgrounds turned to cycling as a mode of transport. However, the lack of cycling infrastructure in cities has caused many altercations between bicycles and motorized vehicles, leading to growing clamor for active transportation infrastructure to promote cycling as a safe and sustainable mode of transportation and alleviate traffic  congestion in cities.

Local government units have since also implemented cycling infrastructure and initiatives in their own cities and municipalities, such as Marikina City, Pasig City, and Quezon City in Metro Manila, Iloilo City in Iloilo, and Vigan City in Ilocos Sur, while other cities such as Mandaluyong included plans to establish bicycle routes around their cities.

On November 15, 2012, the Metropolitan Manila Development Authority (MMDA) and Department of Public Works and Highways (DPWH) opened a  bidirectional bicycle lane on the sidewalk of Roxas Boulevard itself from Quirino Avenue to the Cultural Center of the Philippines Complex. The MMDA also opened a  bidirectional bicycle lane on Remedios Street from Remedios Circle to Roxas Boulevard, designed to complement its Children's Road Safety Park as part of its advocacy to "educate children on traffic rules and discipline". A bicycle-sharing pilot program was also to be conducted between the Ayala and Magallanes MRT stations where commuters could avail 48 bicycles to use for free between the two stations. More bicycle lanes were also opened by the MMDA along the sidewalks of specific segments of EDSA, Commonwealth Avenue, and the Marikina-Infanta Highway.

Throughout 2018 and 2019, the Quezon City government also began establishing bicycle lanes along several major roads in the city. In an interview, Quezon City mayor Herbert Bautista also floated the idea of designating the inner roads of residential subdivisions as cycling corridors.

On February 7, 2019, the DPWH inaugurated the country's first protected bicycle lane along a national highway, located along the Laguna Lake Highway of Circumferential Road 6. The bicycle lane is a  bi-directional Cycling infrastructure#Bikeways spanning  of the  highway, and is physically separated from the highway with a planting strip.

COVID-19 pandemic 
During the COVID-19 pandemic in early 2020, public transport was suspended and subsequently reopened at a limited capacity. As a result, cycling as a mode of transport grew in popularity among Filipinos who needed means to go to and from their workplace safely and efficiently. This, alongside the decreased road traffic in many urban areas as a result of the community quarantine classifications led to the fast-tracked development of active transport infrastructure, such as protected bike lanes and bicycle parking amidst the pandemic, further encouraging bike ridership.

On April 16, 2020, Pasig City became the first local government unit in the country to recognize biking as an essential mode of transport, wherein it passed city resolutions and executive orders for the pavement of bicycle lanes and allowing the reopening of bicycle shops, which were previous considered as non-essential under the community quarantine restrictions.

Establishment of bicycle lane network 

With the country transitioning into the looser general community quarantine and in anticipation of people returning to work, the MMDA, in coordination with cyclists and scooter riders pushing for permanent active transport infrastructure, conducted a dry run of pop-up bicycle lanes along EDSA, the main thoroughfare in Metro Manila on July 3, 2020, coinciding with World Bicycle Day. The agency also vowed to support the provision of bicycle lanes across the metropolis. On the same day, San Juan also formally launched its own bicycle lanes.

The Department of Transportation announced on November 28, 2021, coinciding with National Bicycle Day, that it would be working with Google to push for the inclusion of its national bicycle lane network into Google Maps.

Bicycle use and ownership 
Since 2020, the Social Weather Stations has conducted multiple surveys nationwide assessing the ownership and use of bicycles as a mode of transportation and as a recreational activity.

Based on the latest survey conducted from April 19, 2022, to April 27, 2022, 23 percent of households in the Philippines own bicycles. This is compared to 37 percent of households that own two-wheeled motor vehicles such as motorcycles and electric bicycles, 10 percent of households that own three-wheeled motor vehicles such as motorized and electric tricycles, and 6 percent of households that own four-wheeled motor vehicles such as cars, vans, electric cars, jeepneys, or electric jeepneys.

The April 2022 survey also reveals that among household members that use bicycles, 53.8 percent of household members primarily use them for essential activities such as grocery or shopping trips, workplace commuting, as part of their job or livelihood, or non-work related commutes. On the other hand, 46.1 percent of household members that use bicycles primarily use them for recreational activities such as for exercise, sightseeing, or for other recreational activities.

Additionally, the survey also shows that 79.3 percent of household members use their own bicycles, while the remaining 20.6 percent use a borrowed bicycle.

Intermodal transport and parking 

The use of bicycles as transportation is supported by the inclusion of bicycle parking racks in schools, retail stores, shopping centers, parks and plazas, and transport stops. It also outlines the inclusion of long-term bicycle parking facilities such as bicycle lockers for all-day or overnight bicycle parking.
 
On November 8, 2009, the Light Rail Transit Authority (LRTA) inaugurated its "Bike On, Bike Off" or "Bike O2" project, allowing folding bicycles to be brought onto Line 1 and Line 2 trains for free to promote bimodal transportation to reduce traffic on the road.

In 2020, bicycle racks were installed at Line 1, 2, and 3 stations, as well as on stations of the PNR Metro Commuter Line. The Philippine National Railways allows folding bicycles to be brought on its trains with the bicycle being charged as equivalent to the fare of one person.

Several pedestrian footbridges and underpasses have also been outfitted with bicycle ramps to allow cyclists to bring their bicycles on them, particularly in Quezon City.

Sport and recreation 

In the Philippines, people who cycle as a sport are usually grouped by those who cycle as part of triathlon events, those who cycle for tourism, those who cycle for exercise on weekends, and those who cycle within the vicinity of their neighborhoods.

Road cycling tours are usually held annually by different sports institutions in the country, often spanning long distances such as from Manila to Baguio. These include the annual Le Tour de Filipinas, Ronda Pilipinas, and PRUride Philippines.

In the 1990s, mountain biking grew in popularity as a recreational weekend activity, especially among Filipino yuppies. The province of Rizal is home to several popular mountain biking trails, particularly in its provincial capital of Antipolo. Other popular trail locations can also be found in the city of Tagaytay in Cavite, and the Nuvali real-estate development in Laguna.

Bicycle lane classifications 

The Department of Public Works and Highways and the Department of Transportation through DPWH Department Order No. 88 series of 2020 defines bicycle lanes into three classes, based on prevailing road and traffic conditions. The order also provides that all new road and bridge construction and expansion projects must incorporate bicycle lanes with an absolute minimum width of  These guidelines were then updated in December 2022 through DPWH Department Order No. 263 series of 2022.

Under these guidelines, the maximum slope grade of all bicycle lane crossings and Class I bicycle lanes should not exceed 5 percent, while Class II and Class III bicycle lanes must follow the slope grade of the roadway.

Class I 

Class I bicycle lanes are shared use paths or bike paths, which are designated paths completely separated from the roadway that are designated for the exclusive use of bicycles or shared with pedestrians.

Class II 

Class II bicycle lanes are separated bicycle lanes that use pavement markings or physical separation to designate a portion of the road for exclusive use by bicycles.

It is distinguished by pavement markings using paint, or by physical separation using bollards, curbs, plant boxes, concrete barriers, or a median strip with elevation changes.

Class II bicycle lanes may also be supplemented with a  buffer zone between the bicycle lane and other road lanes.

Class III 

Class III bicycle lanes are shared roadways, which are roads used by motor vehicles but are officially designated as bicycle routes.

These routes are distinguished by signs encouraging road users to be mindful of cyclists. Class III bicycle lanes may also contain brief sections of non-exclusive  painted bicycle lanes with broken lines to limit the movement of cycling traffic on narrow roads.

Class III bicycle lanes may also be used as temporary bicycle lanes until more appropriate infrastructure can be implemented.

Reception 
Prior to the COVID-19 pandemic, the lack of attention to developing bicycle infrastructure in the Philippines had been a point of criticism for cyclists and mobility advocates clamoring for alternative modes of transportation. These individuals and groups cited the high levels of traffic congestion caused by private motor vehicles and overcrowding on public transport in urban areas as reasons for prioritizing the development of cycling infrastructure.

As a result, when the Philippine government increased its focus on active transport infrastructure during the early stages of the COVID-19 pandemic, this was met with support from the public. In support, mobility advocacy groups also called for stronger policies that would support a sustainable and inclusive public transportation system, while also helping provide input on the development of national guidelines for the proper use and promotion of active transport during and after the COVID-19 pandemic.

The implementation of a national bicycle lane network in the Philippines has faced criticism from both motorists and cyclists. Some motorists have argued that the addition of bicycle lanes on major roads has resulted in the removal of lanes previously dedicated to motor vehicles, leading to increased traffic congestion and longer travel times. Cyclists have also criticized the design of the bicycle lane network and the apparent reluctance of the government to prioritize the development of infrastructure for public and active transportation over infrastructure for motor vehicles.

Overlap with road lanes 
Concerns were also raised on the placement of bicycle lanes, with some being overlaid onto existing road lanes rather than being integrated as part of a reconfiguration of the road. This raised concerns about confusion among road users and an increased risk of accidents involving both cyclists and motorists.

In December 2022, motoring journalist James Deakin wrote a column in the Manila Bulletin where he labeled the national government's bicycle lane network as a "failed experiment" due to the "half lane" design and proliferation of motorcycles in the bicycle lanes, which he attributes the latter as one of the reluctances of Filipinos to consider cycling as a mode of transport. Deakin suggested that the bicycle lane should be "salvaged" into a motorcycle lane or removed completely to give "back to cars", which drew criticism online. Voice-over artist and content creator Inka Magnaye, in response to Deakin's column, showed annoyance at the "bandaid solution" design of the bicycle lanes, urging the need to improve them to be safer for cyclists and motorists alike. However, her remarks were interpreted as a criticism against bicycle lanes, sparking multiple discussions online on road safety for drivers and cyclists alike

Bicycle-related accidents 
Due to the growing popularity of cycling brought upon by the COVID-19 pandemic, the number of bicycle-related road accidents have also increased.

In a column in The Manila Times in June 2020, then-Manila mayor Isko Moreno expressed his reluctance in complying with the national government's directive to put up bicycle lanes in Manila, stating that the city streets are too dangerous to normalize cycling on due to the presence of unruly motorists and "gargantuan" trucks. Cycling advocacy group Cycling Matters responded to Moreno's column, criticizing his arguments for complaining about the unsafe conditions for cyclists while not taking the "long overdue responsibility" to make Manila's roads safer for them.

The Metropolitan Manila Development Authority (MMDA) reported a total of 1,759 accidents in 2019, which had increased to 2,503 accidents in 2020, and slightly decreased to 2,397 accidents in 2021 along major roads within its jurisdiction. Most of these accidents were reported to be non-fatal and a third of these were reported as damage to property. The MMDA has noted, however, that its data as of 2020 has since included road accidents involving pedicabs and electric bicycles. Many of these accidents have been attributed to a lack of protected bicycle lanes and traffic calming measures to allow bicycles to safely navigate through heavily congested roads.

Obstacles along bicycle lanes 
Since the establishment of the nationwide bicycle lane network, motorists have complained that cyclists and other non-motorized transport users often leave or do not use the bicycle lanes, causing these users to go on open roads. However, many cyclists have also aired their grievances on social media on obstacles within the bicycle lanes, ranging from potholes, puddles, metal sheets covering roadworks, dangerous drain covers, utility poles, parked vehicles, and motor vehicles entering unprotected segments of the bicycle lanes to turn or overtake. As a result, cyclists often go in and out of the bicycle lanes around these obstacles or avoid using the bicycle lanes completely. Cycling advocates have also argued that bicycle lanes are not meant to "cage" cyclists into bicycle lanes but to keep motor vehicle users out of them.

See also 
 Sports in the Philippines
 Transportation in the Philippines
 Transportation in Metro Manila
 List of roads in Metro Manila
 Cycling advocacy

References 

Cycling in the Philippines